Catherine Ann "Cate" Archer, codenamed The Fox, is a player character and the protagonist in the No One Lives Forever video game series by Monolith Productions.  Cate, a covert operative for British-based counter-terrorism organization UNITY, is the main character in The Operative: No One Lives Forever (2000) and No One Lives Forever 2: A Spy in H.A.R.M.'s Way (2002), and is also featured in Contract J.A.C.K., an official prequel to the second game.

Appearances
Archer is the only playable character in the series' main games, The Operative: No One Lives Forever and No One Lives Forever 2: A Spy In H.A.R.M.'s Way. In the latter, there is a cooperative multiplayer level in which one needs to rescue Archer while she is unconscious, playing as a UNITY agent. She also makes a short appearance (as non-player character) and is a playable multiplayer character in Contract J.A.C.K.

Cate Archer was born in Scotland in late March 1942 to a privileged English-Scottish family. Her mother died soon after she was born and her father committed suicide in 1956. Prior to joining UNITY, Archer pursued a career as a professional thief, on the one hand to provide for herself and on the other because she found it gratifying. She was discovered by agent Bruno Lawrie when Archer stole his watch that had an in-built tracking device. By the time she arrived at her flat, Lawrie was waiting there. Admiring her talent and bravery, he decided to give her a future as an operative for UNITY - an international agency charged with combating terrorism around the globe.

Before the First H.A.R.M Incident, Archer mainly dealt with minor ignorable assignments. She was not completely satisfied with her career at UNITY, since she thought that there was no real value in her daily work. Also, she was the first female operative of UNITY, so nobody (except Bruno) believed in her. In September 1967, seven active UNITY field operatives were killed by Dmitrij Volkov, a mysterious assassin, who always left a red lily upon his victim. All traces pointed to a terorist organization called H.A.R.M. This emergency situation forced the organization to call upon Archer to undertake her first major assignment. She and Bruno Lawrie went to Morocco, thereby beginning the chain of events which unfold in the first game. The missions were failed one after another, as if someone knew about their plans, yet she survived all the time. Mr. Smith didn't trust her, which was even furthered by his sexism. However, Mr. Jones gave her last chance. In the end of the first game Archer killed two primary antagonists: Baroness Dumas and Dmitrij Volkov (who would turn to be alive), and also exposed the traitors within UNITY. By the time the incident was resolved, she had gained the respect of her superiors and colleagues, and came to be regarded as one of UNITY's top field agents.

Character design

The in-game model of Cate Archer was styled after model and actress Mitzi Martin. This was a marketing decision made by the publisher, Fox Interactive, which used its feature film casting department to look for an appropriate model internationally. Archer's voice was provided by American voice actress Kit Harris, who also did the voice of the Inge Wagner character. Originally, Harris recorded the Scottish protagonist's voice in a stronger Scottish accent. This was changed after a Scottish producer of the game felt that the particular accent used was too lower class, and an inappropriate choice; Harris re-recorded her lines with a "British bent" instead.

In the game's sequel, the face was changed to more closely resemble English model and actress Jean Shrimpton. Voice acting was done by American actress Jen Taylor, who also voiced Isako and the ninjas.

Aspects of Archer's character and look bear similarity to that of 1960s-era comic strip character Modesty Blaise and of Monica Vitti's portrayal of Blaise in the 1966 film adaptation.

During the original game she met a lot of sexism of Mr. Smith and Tom Goodman. But Mr. Jones and her two enemies, Dmitrij Volkov the Russian and Magnus Armstrong the Scotsman, didn't underestimate her (the latter vanished from HARM in the end and becomes Cate's ally in the sequel). During Smith's provocations player can either choose aggressive dialogue options leaving him with his sexist beliefs or answer calmly, thus proving that Archer is a competent agent. The other sexism was shown in code phrases during mission in Berlin, even disgusting the contacts.

Despite suffering from being a poor aristocrat, losing her parents during childhood and being a thief, Archer is calm, gentle, kind, forgiving and even ironical person, and is firmly convinced of the good. In contrast, Baroness Dumas is cynical, sociopathic and mean, while also believing in the absence of good. In the sequel, ninja woman Isako’s indebted to the H.A.R.M. Director who toys with her, promising Isako freedom if she brings him Cate’s head, then says she is his and he’ll never let her go. After defeating Isako last time, Archer saves the ninja from The Director but doesn't want her to be indebted again. Also, while the Baroness is an evil aristocrat, Isako is an anti-villain who doesn't want to really kill Cate.

Reception
In 2007, Cate was included by Tom's Games on the list of the 50 greatest female characters in video game history ("As a delightfully retro 1960s British agent, Archer is the female equivalent of James Bond. She's irresistibly sexy, stubbornly headstrong and proficient with all sorts of Bond-like gadgets"), That same year, Cate was ranked sixth in ActionTrip's list of top "video game chicks", and the site's writer stated: "Apart from being one of most attractive game heroines out there, she's the female equivalent of James Bond and not many chicks can stand up to that. She's sexy and there's simply nothing she can't handle." In 2008, Play listed her as one of their favorite female characters in their sixth "Girls of Gaming" issue, stating she's "as badass as Bourne and as suave as Bond," while noting their desire to see her return in another title. That same year, she was ranked as 25th on GameDaily's list of "hottest game babes" list, cited as attractive despite her conservative attire compared to other female characters, and third in UGO.com's list of "girls of gaming", compared to Emma Peel and called a female counterpart to Bond in terms of appeal. She was one of the characters featured in UGO's 2008 list of top 11 spies in all media, stating she "perfectly captures the swinging spy style". In 2009, this "smart, tough heroine" was one of the 64 characters chosen for the GameSpot's poll All Time Greatest Game Hero, but lost in the first round against Strider Hiryu. In 2011, GamesRadar named her "Miss 2000" in their article on the sexiest new characters of the decade. Tom's Guide included this "smooth operator" on their 2013 list of the 20 "hottest video game babes" for making "international espionage classy and sexy all at once." In a 2021 article Collider said Archer was "a wonder of a character, with a razor-sharp wit and a wardrobe to match."

Some fans theorise that Cate Archer had implied romance with either Magnus Armstrong or Isako, whom she freed from the life debt.

See also
List of female action heroes

References

Further reading

Fictional criminals in video games
Female characters in video games
Fictional British people in video games
Fictional professional thieves
Fictional Scottish people
First-person shooter characters
Monolith Productions
Fictional secret agents and spies in video games
Video game characters based on real people
Video game characters introduced in 2000
Nobility characters in video games
Video game protagonists
Woman soldier and warrior characters in video games